Erysimum menziesii is a species of Erysimum known by the common name Menzies' wallflower.

This rare plant is endemic to California. It is found only in the declining beach sand dune habitat in three areas on the California coastline, in Humboldt, Mendocino, and Monterey Counties. It is listed as an endangered species on the California state and federal levels. There are three to four subspecies depending on the authority, and each is rare.

Description
Erysimum menziesii is a mustardlike biennial or perennial herb which is short in size, reaching maximum heights of usually not more than 15 centimeters. The leaves are long and straight along the stem, and often thicker, hairier, and lobed in shape at the base. The top of the stem is occupied by a thick bunch of flowers with bright yellow, rounded petals. The flowers fall away to leave behind the fruits, which are very long siliques sticking straight out. The plant can vary in appearance, particularly across subspecies.

At least one subspecies is pollinated by the similarly distressed bee Emphoropsis miserabilis. The plant has high fecundity, but very low seedling survivorship, with over 98% of seedlings perishing within the first year. At least one subspecies is commonly infected with the white rust fungus Albugo canadensis.

Subspecies
Subspecies include:
E. m. ssp. eurekense (Humboldt Bay wallflower) — known from a few occurrences in the vicinity of Humboldt Bay. It grows with other beach species such as beach sagewort (Artemisia pycnocephala), coast buckwheat (Eriogonum latifolium), (sand verbena (Abronia latifolia), and (beach pea (Lathyrus littoralis). It occurs within the Humboldt Bay National Wildlife Refuge. Some of its habitat is on beaches owned by the city of Eureka, California, and by private entities.
E. m. ssp. menziesii — a plant with a disjunct distribution on either side of the San Francisco Bay Area, it is known from the Mendocino Coast and Monterey Peninsula. It grows in bare beach sand which is often wet from the tides and seaspray, and can be battered by storms. Other plants in the area include evening primrose (Camissonia cheiranthifolia), beach bur (Ambrosia chamissonis), sea rocket (Cakile maritima), and beach knotweed (Polygonum paronychia). The northern population is mostly within MacKerricher State Park and the southern occurs on Asilomar State Beach and a few nearby dunes.
E. m. ssp. yadonii (Yadon's wallflower) — known from a few occurrences near Marina in Monterey County. Some of have been destroyed by mining operations and other factors. Some plants occur at Marina State Beach, including some individuals which have been propagated and planted in appropriate habitat.
E. m. ssp. concinnum (curly wallflower) — known from  Mendocino County into Oregon. This subspecies was revised from Erysimum concinnum to a subspecies of E. menziesii after the 1992 listing, so it was not included under the  Endangered Species Act.

Conservation
Because Erysimum menziesii ssp. concinnum has been included within this species since it received its federal listing as Erysimum concinnum, the species is now technically more abundant than it was then, but there is no current reliable estimate of the species' abundance now. In 1997, there were about 22 occurrences containing 33,000 individuals, not counting ssp. concinnum.

A number of forces threaten the species' existence. Minor threats include trampling by hikers and horseback riders, off-road vehicles, and sand mining operations. Many occurrences of the plant are protected from these threats. A more major threat is the invasion of non-native plant species such as Pampas grass (Cortaderia jubata). Conservation projects underway for the species include removal of this vegetation from the habitat.

References

External links
Jepson Manual Treatment
USDA Plants Profile
California DFG Profile
Photo gallery

menziesii
Flora of California
Flora of Oregon
Natural history of Humboldt County, California
Natural history of Mendocino County, California
Natural history of Monterey County, California